Kinley Dorji (born 30 August 1986) is a Bhutanese international footballer and manager who last played for Ugyen Academy. He made his first appearance for the Bhutan national football team in 2008.

Career statistics

International goals

References

1986 births
Living people
Bhutanese footballers
Bhutan international footballers
Bhutanese football managers
Transport United F.C. players
Yeedzin F.C. players
Association football midfielders